Methylphenidate, sold under the brand names Ritalin and Concerta among others, is a central nervous system (CNS) stimulant used medically to treat attention deficit hyperactivity disorder (ADHD) and, to a lesser extent, narcolepsy. It is a primary medication for ADHD (e.g. in UK); it may be taken by mouth or applied to the skin, and different formulations have varying durations of effect, commonly ranging from 2–4 hours. Methylphenidate's efficacy as a athletic performance enhancer, cognitive enhancer, aphrodisiac, and euphoriant is somewhat supported by research. However, the manner in which methylphenidate is used for these purposes (high doses and temperatures, alternate routes of administration, etc.) can result in severe unintended side effects.

Common adverse reactions of methylphenidate include: tachycardia, palpitations, headache, insomnia, anxiety, hyperhidrosis, weight loss, decreased appetite, dry mouth, nausea, and abdominal pain. Withdrawal symptoms may include: chills, depression, drowsiness, dysphoria, exhaustion, headache, irritability, lethargy, nightmares, restlessness, suicidal thoughts, and weakness.

Methylphenidate is believed to work by blocking the reuptake of dopamine and norepinephrine by neurons. It is a central nervous system (CNS) stimulant of the phenethylamine and piperidine classes. Despite the claim made by some urban legends, it is not a cocaine derivative nor analog; cocaine is a local anesthetic and ligand channel blocker with SNDRI action, while methylphenidate is an NDRI with 2–3 fold selectivity for the dopamine transporter (DAT) over the norepinephrine transporter (NET). Cocaine is also more potent in serotonin transporters (SERTs) than NDRI sites.

Etymology 
The word methylphenidate is a portmanteau of the chemical name, Methyl-2-phenyl-2-(piperidin-2-yl) acetate.

History 
Methylphenidate was first synthesized in 1944 and was approved for medical use in the United States in 1955. It was originally sold by Swiss company CIBA (now Novartis). It was estimated that the number of doses of methylphenidate used globally in 2013 increased by 66% compared to 2012. In 2020, it was the 41st most commonly prescribed medication in the United States, with more than 15million prescriptions. It is available as a generic medication.

Uses 
Methylphenidate is most commonly used to treat ADHD and narcolepsy.

Attention deficit hyperactivity disorder 
Methylphenidate is used for the treatment of attention deficit hyperactivity disorder. The addition of behavioural modification therapy can have additional benefits on treatment outcome. The dosage may vary and is titrated to effect, with some guidelines recommending initial treatment with a low dose. Immediate release methylphenidate is used daily along with the longer-acting form to achieve full-day control of symptoms. Methylphenidate is not approved for children under six years of age.

In children over age 6 and adolescents, the short-term benefits and cost effectiveness of methylphenidate are well established. A number of reviews have established the safety and effectiveness for individuals with ADHD over several years.

Approximately 70% of those who use methylphenidate see improvements in ADHD symptoms. Children with ADHD who use stimulant medications generally have better relationships with peers and family members, perform better in school, are less distractible and impulsive, and have longer attention spans. There is evidence to suggest that children diagnosed with ADHD who do not receive treatment will have an increased risk of substance use disorders as adults.

The precise magnitude of improvement in ADHD symptoms and quality of life that are produced by methylphenidate treatment remains uncertain as of November 2015. Methylphenidate is not included in the World Health Organization Essential Medicines List, as findings by the World Health Organization indicate that evidence of benefit versus harm to be unclear in the treatment of ADHD. A 2021 systematic review did not find clear evidence for using IR Methylphenidate (immediate-release) for adults.

Since ADHD diagnosis has increased around the world, methylphenidate may be misused as a "study drug" by some populations, which may be harmful. This also applies to people who may be experiencing a different issue and are misdiagnosed with ADHD. People in this category can then experience negative side-effects of the drug which worsen their condition.

Narcolepsy 
Narcolepsy, a chronic sleep disorder characterized by overwhelming daytime drowsiness and uncontrollable sleep, is treated primarily with stimulants. Methylphenidate is considered effective in increasing wakefulness, vigilance, and performance. Methylphenidate improves measures of somnolence on standardized tests, such as the Multiple Sleep Latency Test (MSLT), but performance does not improve to levels comparable to healthy people.

Other medical uses 
Methylphenidate may also be prescribed for off-label use in treatment-resistant cases of bipolar disorder and major depressive disorder. It can also improve depression in several groups including stroke, cancer, and HIV-positive patients. There is weak evidence in favor of methylphenidate's effectiveness for depression, including providing additional benefit in combination with antidepressants. In individuals with terminal cancer, methylphenidate can be used to counteract opioid-induced somnolence, to increase the analgesic effects of opioids, to treat depression, and to improve cognitive function. A 2021 systematic review and meta-analysis found that all studies on geriatric depression reported positive results of methylphenidate use; the review recommended short-term use in combination with citalopram. A 2018 review found low quality evidence supporting its use to treat apathy as seen in Alzheimer's Disease in addition to slight benefits for cognition and cognitive performance.

Enhancing performance
A 2015 review found that therapeutic doses of amphetamine and methylphenidate result in modest improvements in cognition, including working memory, episodic memory, and inhibitory control, in normal healthy adults;
the cognition-enhancing effects of these drugs are known to occur through the indirect activation of both dopamine receptor D1 and adrenoceptor α2 in the prefrontal cortex. Methylphenidate and other ADHD stimulants also improve task saliency and increase arousal. Stimulants such as amphetamine and methylphenidate can improve performance on difficult and boring tasks, and are used by some students as a study and test-taking aid. Based upon studies of self-reported illicit stimulant use, performance-enhancing use rather than use as a recreational drug, is the primary reason that students use stimulants.

Excessive doses of methylphenidate, above the therapeutic range, can interfere with working memory and cognitive control. Like amphetamine and bupropion, methylphenidate increases stamina and endurance in humans primarily through reuptake inhibition of dopamine in the central nervous system. Similar to the loss of cognitive enhancement when using large amounts, large doses of methylphenidate can induce side effects that impair athletic performance, such as rhabdomyolysis and hyperthermia. While literature suggests it might improve cognition, most authors agree that using the drug as a study aid when ADHD diagnosis is not present does not actually improve GPA. Moreover, it has been suggested that students who use the drug for studying may be self-medicating for potentially deeper underlying issues.

Contraindications 
Methylphenidate is contraindicated for individuals using monoamine oxidase inhibitors (e.g., phenelzine, and tranylcypromine), or individuals with agitation, tics, glaucoma, heart defects or a hypersensitivity to any ingredients contained in methylphenidate pharmaceuticals.

Pregnant women are advised to only use the medication if the benefits outweigh the potential risks. Not enough human studies have been conducted to conclusively demonstrate an effect of methylphenidate on fetal development. In 2018, a review concluded that it has not been teratogenic in rats and rabbits, and that it "is not a major human teratogen".

Adverse effects 

The most common side effects associated with methylphenidate (in standard and extended-release formulations) are appetite loss, dry mouth, anxiety/nervousness, nausea, and insomnia. Gastrointestinal adverse effects may include abdominal pain and weight loss. Nervous system adverse effects may include akathisia (agitation/restlessness), irritability, dyskinesia (tics), oromandibular dystonia, lethargy (drowsiness/fatigue), and dizziness. Cardiac adverse effects may include palpitations, changes in blood pressure, and heart rate (typically mild), and tachycardia (rapid heart rate). Ophthalmologic adverse effects may include blurred vision caused by pupil dilatation and dry eyes, with less frequent reports of diplopia and mydriasis.

Smokers with ADHD who take methylphenidate may increase their nicotine dependence, and smoke more often than before they began using methylphenidate, with increased nicotine cravings and an average increase of 1.3 cigarettes per day.

There is some evidence of mild reductions in height with prolonged treatment in children.

Hypersensitivity (including skin rash, urticaria, and fever) is sometimes reported when using transdermal methylphenidate. The Daytrana patch has a much higher rate of skin reactions than oral methylphenidate.

Methylphenidate can worsen psychosis in people who are psychotic, and in very rare cases it has been associated with the emergence of new psychotic symptoms. It should be used with extreme caution in people with bipolar disorder due to the potential induction of mania or hypomania. There have been very rare reports of suicidal ideation, but some authors claim that evidence does not support a link. Logorrhea is occasionally reported. Libido disorders, disorientation, and visual hallucinations are very rarely reported. Priapism is a very rare adverse event that can be potentially serious.

U.S. Food and Drug Administration-commissioned studies in 2011, indicate that in children, young adults, and adults there is no association between serious adverse cardiovascular events (sudden death, heart attack, and stroke) and the medical use of methylphenidate or other ADHD stimulants.

Because some adverse effects may only emerge during chronic use of methylphenidate, a constant watch for adverse effects is recommended.

A 2018 Cochrane review found that methylphenidate might be associated with serious side effects such as heart problems, psychosis, and death. The certainty of the evidence was stated as very low.

A 2018 review found tentative evidence that it may cause both serious and non-serious adverse effects in children.

Overdose 
The symptoms of a moderate acute overdose on methylphenidate primarily arise from central nervous system overstimulation; these symptoms include: vomiting, nausea, agitation, tremors, hyperreflexia, muscle twitching, euphoria, confusion, hallucinations, delirium, hyperthermia, sweating, flushing, headache, tachycardia, heart palpitations, cardiac arrhythmias, hypertension, mydriasis, and dryness of mucous membranes. A severe overdose may involve symptoms such as hyperpyrexia, sympathomimetic toxidrome, convulsions, paranoia, stereotypy (a repetitive movement disorder), rhabdomyolysis, coma, and circulatory collapse.
A methylphenidate overdose is rarely fatal with appropriate care. Following injection of methylphenidate tablets into an artery, severe toxic reactions involving abscess formation and necrosis have been reported.

Treatment of a methylphenidate overdose typically involves the administration of benzodiazepines, with antipsychotics, α-adrenoceptor agonists and propofol serving as second-line therapies.

Addiction and dependence
Methylphenidate is a stimulant with an addiction liability and dependence liability similar to amphetamine. It has moderate liability among addictive drugs; accordingly, addiction and psychological dependence are possible and likely when methylphenidate is used at high doses as a recreational drug. When used above the medical dose range, stimulants are associated with the development of stimulant psychosis.

Biomolecular mechanisms 

Methylphenidate has the potential to induce euphoria due to its pharmacodynamic effect (i.e., dopamine reuptake inhibition) in the brain's reward system. At therapeutic doses, ADHD stimulants do not sufficiently activate the reward system; consequently, when taken as directed in doses that are commonly prescribed for the treatment of ADHD, methylphenidate use lacks the capacity to cause an addiction.

Interactions 
Methylphenidate may inhibit the metabolism of vitamin K anticoagulants, certain anticonvulsants, and some antidepressants (tricyclic antidepressants, and selective serotonin reuptake inhibitors). Concomitant administration may require dose adjustments, possibly assisted by monitoring of plasma drug concentrations. There are several case reports of methylphenidate inducing serotonin syndrome with concomitant administration of antidepressants.

When methylphenidate is coingested with ethanol, a metabolite called ethylphenidate is formed via hepatic transesterification, not unlike the hepatic formation of cocaethylene from cocaine and ethanol. The reduced potency of ethylphenidate and its minor formation means it does not contribute to the pharmacological profile at therapeutic doses and even in overdose cases ethylphenidate concentrations remain negligible.

Coingestion of alcohol (ethanol) also increases the blood plasma levels of d-methylphenidate by up to 40%.

Liver toxicity from methylphenidate is extremely rare, but limited evidence suggests that intake of β-adrenergic agonists with methylphenidate may increase the risk of liver toxicity.

Pharmacology

Pharmacodynamics 

Methylphenidate primarily acts as a norepinephrine–dopamine reuptake inhibitor (NDRI). It is a benzylpiperidine and phenethylamine derivative which also shares part of its basic structure with catecholamines.

Methylphenidate is a psychostimulant and increases the activity of the central nervous system through inhibition on reuptake of the neurotransmitters norepinephrine and dopamine. As models of ADHD suggest, it is associated with functional impairments in some of the brain's neurotransmitter systems, particularly those involving dopamine in the mesocortical and mesolimbic pathways and norepinephrine in the prefrontal cortex and locus coeruleus. Psychostimulants like methylphenidate and amphetamine may be effective in treating ADHD because they increase neurotransmitter activity in these systems. When reuptake of those neurotransmitters is halted, its concentration and effects in the synapse increase and last longer, respectively. Therefore, methylphenidate is called a norepinephrine–dopamine reuptake inhibitor. By increasing the effects of norepinephrine and dopamine, methylphenidate increases the activity of the central nervous system and produces effects such as increased alertness, reduced fatigue, and improved attention.

Methylphenidate is most active at modulating levels of dopamine (DA) and to a lesser extent norepinephrine (NE). Methylphenidate binds to and blocks dopamine transporters (DAT) and norepinephrine transporters (NET). Variability exists between DAT blockade, and extracellular dopamine, leading to the hypothesis that methylphenidate amplifies basal dopamine activity, leading to nonresponse in those with low basal DA activity. On average, methylphenidate elicits a 3–4 times increase in dopamine and norepinephrine in the striatum and prefrontal cortex. Magnetic resonance imaging (MRI) studies suggest that long-term treatment with ADHD stimulants (specifically, amphetamine and methylphenidate) decreases abnormalities in brain structure and function found in subjects with ADHD.

Both amphetamine and methylphenidate are predominantly dopaminergic drugs, yet their mechanisms of action are distinct. Methylphenidate acts as a norepinephrine–dopamine reuptake inhibitor, while amphetamine is both a releasing agent and reuptake inhibitor of dopamine and norepinephrine. Methylphenidate's mechanism of action in the release of dopamine and norepinephrine is fundamentally different from most other phenethylamine derivatives, as methylphenidate is thought to increase neuronal firing rate, whereas amphetamine reduces firing rate, but causes monoamine release by reversing the flow of the monoamines through monoamine transporters via a diverse set of mechanisms, including TAAR1 activation and modulation of VMAT2 function, among other mechanisms.
The difference in mechanism of action between methylphenidate and amphetamine results in methylphenidate inhibiting amphetamine's effects on monoamine transporters when they are co-administered.

Methylphenidate has both dopamine transporter and norepinephrine transporter binding affinity, with the dextromethylphenidate enantiomers displaying a prominent affinity for the norepinephrine transporter. Both the dextrorotary and levorotary enantiomers displayed receptor affinity for the serotonergic 5HT1A and 5HT2B subtypes, though direct binding to the serotonin transporter was not observed. A later study confirmed the d-threo-methylphenidate (dexmethylphenidate) binding to the 5HT1A receptor, but no significant activity on the 5HT2B receptor was found.

There exist some paradoxical findings that oppose the notion that methylphenidate acts as silent antagonist of the DAT (DAT inhibitor). 80% occupancy of the DAT is necessary for methylphenidate's euphoriant effect, but re-administration of methylphenidate beyond this level of DAT occupancy has been found to produce similarly potent euphoriant effects (despite DAT occupancy being unchanged with repeated administration). By contrast, other DAT inhibitors such as bupropion have not been observed to exhibit this effect. These observations help corroborate the hypothesis that methylphenidate may act as a "DAT inverse agonist" or "negative allosteric modifier of the DAT" by reversing the direction of the dopamine efflux by the DAT at higher dosages.

Methylphenidate may protect neurons from the neurotoxic effects of Parkinson's disease and methamphetamine use disorder. The hypothesized mechanism of neuroprotection is through inhibition of methamphetamine-DAT interactions, and through reducing cytosolic dopamine, leading to decreased production of dopamine-related reactive oxygen species.

The dextrorotary enantiomers are significantly more potent than the levorotary enantiomers, and some medications therefore only contain dexmethylphenidate. The studied maximized daily dosage of OROS methylphenidate appears to be 144 mg/day.

Pharmacokinetics 

Methylphenidate taken by mouth has a bioavailability of 11–52% with a duration of action around 2–4 hours for instant release (i.e. Ritalin), 3–8 hours for sustained release (i.e. Ritalin SR), and 8–12 hours for extended release (i.e. Concerta). The half-life of methylphenidate is 2–3 hours, depending on the individual. The peak plasma time is achieved at about 2 hours. Methylphenidate has a low plasma protein binding of 10–33% and a volume of distribution of 2.65 L/kg.

Dextromethylphenidate is much more bioavailable than levomethylphenidate when administered orally, and is primarily responsible for the psychoactivity of racemic methylphenidate.

The oral bioavailability and speed of absorption for immediate-release methylphenidate is increased when administered with a meal. The effects of a high fat meal on the observed Cmax differ between some extended release formulations, with combined IR/ER and OROS formulations showing reduced Cmax levels while liquid-based extended release formulations showed increased Cmax levels when administered with a high fat meal, according to some researchers. A 2003 study, however, showed no difference between a high fat meal administration and a fasting administration of oral methylphenidate.

Methylphenidate is metabolized into ritalinic acid by CES1A1 enzymes in the liver. Dextromethylphenidate is selectively metabolized at a slower rate than levomethylphenidate. 97% of the metabolised drug is excreted in the urine, and between 1 and 3% is excreted in the faeces. A small amount, less than 1%, of the drug is excreted in the urine in its unchanged form.

Chemistry 

Four isomers of methylphenidate are possible, since the molecule has two chiral centers. One pair of threo isomers and one pair of erythro are distinguished, from which primarily d-threo-methylphenidate exhibits the pharmacologically desired effects. The erythro diastereomers are pressor amines, a property not shared with the threo diastereomers. When the drug was first introduced it was sold as a 4:1 mixture of erythro:threo diastereomers, but it was later reformulated to contain only the threo diastereomers. "TMP" refers to a threo product that does not contain any erythro diastereomers, i.e. (±)-threo-methylphenidate. Since the threo isomers are energetically favored, it is easy to epimerize out any of the undesired erythro isomers. The drug that contains only dextrorotatory methylphenidate is sometimes called d-TMP, although this name is only rarely used and it is much more commonly referred to as dexmethylphenidate, d-MPH, or d-threo-methylphenidate. A review on the synthesis of enantiomerically pure (2R,2'R)-(+)-threo-methylphenidate hydrochloride has been published.

Detection in biological fluids 

The concentration of methylphenidate or ritalinic acid, its major metabolite, may be quantified in plasma, serum or whole blood in order to monitor compliance in those receiving the drug therapeutically, to confirm the diagnosis in potential poisoning victims or to assist in the forensic investigation in a case of fatal overdosage.

History 
Methylphenidate was first synthesized in 1944. It was synthesized by Ciba (now Novartis) chemist Leandro Panizzon. He named the drug after his wife Margarita, nicknamed Rita, who used Ritalin to compensate for low blood pressure. Methylphenidate was not reported to be a stimulant until 1954. The drug was introduced for medical use in the United States in 1957. Originally, it was marketed as a mixture of two racemates, 80% (±)-erythro and 20% (±)-threo, under the brand name Centedrin. Subsequent studies of the racemates showed that the central stimulant activity is associated with the threo racemate and were focused on the separation and interconversion of the erythro isomer into the more active threo isomer. The erythro isomer was eliminated and now modern formulations of methyphenidate contain only the threo isomer at a 50:50 mixture of d- and l-isomers.

Methylphenidate was first used to allay barbiturate-induced coma, narcolepsy and depression. It was later used to treat memory deficits in the elderly. Beginning in the 1960s, it was used to treat children with ADHD based on earlier work starting with the studies by American psychiatrist Charles Bradley on the use of psychostimulant drugs, such as Benzedrine, with then called "maladjusted children". Production and prescription of methylphenidate rose significantly in the 1990s, especially in the United States, as the ADHD diagnosis came to be better understood and more generally accepted within the medical and mental health communities.

In 2000, Alza Corporation received US FDA approval to market Concerta, an extended-release form of methylphenidate.

Society and culture

Names 

Methylphenidate is sold in the majority of countries worldwide. Brand names for methylphenidate include Ritalin (in honor to Rita, the wife of the molecule discoverer), Rilatin (in Belgium to avoid a conflict of commercial name with the RIT pharmaceutical company), Concerta, Medikinet, Adaphen, Addwize, Inspiral, Methmild, Artige, Attenta, Cognil, Equasym, Foquest, Methylin, Penid, Phenida, Prohiper, and Tradea.

Available forms 
The dextrorotary enantiomer of methylphenidate, known as dexmethylphenidate, is sold as a generic and under the brand names Focalin and Attenade in both an immediate-release and an extended-release form. In some circumstances it may be prescribed instead of methylphenidate, however it has no significant advantages over methylphenidate at equally potent doses, and so it is sometimes considered to be an example of an "evergreened" drug.

Immediate-release 

Methylphenidate was originally available as an immediate-release racemic mixture formulation under the Novartis brand name Ritalin, although a variety of generics are available, some under other brand names. Generic brand names include Ritalina, Rilatine, Attenta, Medikinet, Metadate, Methylin, Penid, Tranquilyn, and Rubifen.

Extended-release 
Extended-release methylphenidate products include:

Concerta tablets are marked with the letters "ALZA" and followed by: "18", "27", "36", or "54", relating to the mg dosage strength. Approximately 22% of the dose is immediate release, and the remaining 78% of the dose is released over 10–12 hours post-ingestion, with an initial increase over the first 6 to 7 hours, and subsequent decline in released drug.

Ritalin LA capsules are marked with the letters "NVR" (abbrev.: Novartis) and followed by: "R20", "R30", or "R40", depending on the (mg) dosage strength. Ritalin LA provides two standard doses – half the total dose being released immediately and the other half released four hours later. In total, each capsule is effective for about eight hours.

Metadate CD capsules contain two types of beads; 30% are immediate release, and the other 70% are evenly sustained release.

Medikinet Retard/CR/Adult/Modified Release tablets is an extended-release oral capsule form of Methylphenidate. It delivers 50% of dosage as IR MPH and the remaining 50% in 3–4 hours.

Skin patch
A methylphenidate skin patch is sold under the brand name Daytrana in the United States. It was developed and marketed by Noven Pharmaceuticals and approved in the US in 2006. It is also referred to as methylphenidate transdermal system (MTS). It is approved as a once daily treatment in children with ADHD aged 6–17 years. It is mainly prescribed as a second-line treatment when oral forms are not well tolerated, or if people have difficulty with compliance. Noven's original FDA submission indicated that it should be used for 12 hours. When the FDA rejected the submission they requested evidence that a shorter time period was safe and effective, Noven provided such evidence and it was approved for a 9 hour period.

Orally administered methylphenidate is subject to first-pass metabolism, by which the levo-isomer is extensively metabolized. By circumventing this first-pass metabolism, the relative concentrations of ℓ-threo-methylphenidate are much higher with transdermal administration (50–60% of those of dexmethylphenidate instead of about 14–27%).

A 39 nanograms/mL peak serum concentration of methylphenidate be has been found to occur between 7.5–10.5 hours after administration. However the onset to peak effect is 2 hours and the clinical effects remain up to 2 hours after patch has been removed. The absorption is increased when the transdermal patch is applied onto inflamed skin or skin that has been exposed to heat. The absorption lasts for approximately 9 hours after application (onto normal, unexposed to heat and uninflamed skin). 90% of the medication is excreted in the urine as metabolites and unchanged drug.

Cost 

Brand-name and generic formulations are available.

Legal status 

 Internationally, methylphenidate is a Schedule II drug under the Convention on Psychotropic Substances.
 In the United States, methylphenidate is classified as a Schedule II controlled substance, the designation used for substances that have a recognized medical value but present a high potential for misuse.
 In the United Kingdom, methylphenidate is a controlled 'Class B' substance. Possession without prescription carries a sentence up to 5 years or an unlimited fine, or both; supplying methylphenidate is 14 years or an unlimited fine, or both.
 In Canada, methylphenidate is listed in Schedule III of the Controlled Drugs and Substances Act and is illegal to possess without a prescription, with unlawful possession punishable by up to three years imprisonment, or (via summary conviction) by up to one year imprisonment and/or fines of up to two thousand dollars. Unlawful possession for the purpose of trafficking is punishable by up to ten years imprisonment, or (via summary conviction) by up to eighteen months imprisonment.
 In New Zealand, methylphenidate is a 'class B2 controlled substance'. Unlawful possession is punishable by six-month prison sentence and distribution by a 14-year sentence.
 In Australia, methylphenidate is a 'Schedule 8' controlled substance. Such drugs must be kept in a lockable safe until dispensed and possession without prescription is punishable by fines and imprisonment.
 In Russia, methylphenidate is a List I controlled psychotropic substance without recognized medical value. The Constant Committee for Drug Control of the Russian Ministry of Health has put methylphenidate and its derivatives on the National List of Narcotics, Psychotropic Substances and Their Precursors and the Government banned methylphenidate for any use on 25 October 2014.
 In Sweden, methylphenidate is a List II controlled substance with recognized medical value. Possession without a prescription is punishable by up to three years in prison.
 In France, methylphenidate is covered by the "narcotics" schedule, prescription and distribution conditions are restricted with hospital-only prescription for the initial treatment and yearly consultations.
 In India, methylphenidate is a schedule X drug and is controlled by the Drugs and Cosmetics Rule, 1945. It is dispensed only by physician's prescription. Legally, 2 grams of methylphenidate are classified as a small quantity, and 50 grams as a large or commercial quantity.
 In Hong Kong, methylphenidate is controlled under the schedule 1 of the Dangerous Drugs Ordinance (cap. 134).

Controversy 

Methylphenidate has been the subject of controversy in relation to its use in the treatment of ADHD. The prescription of psychostimulant medication to children to reduce ADHD symptoms has been a major point of criticism. The contention that methylphenidate acts as a gateway drug has been discredited by multiple sources, according to which abuse is statistically very low and "stimulant therapy in childhood does not increase the risk for subsequent drug and alcohol abuse disorders later in life". A study found that ADHD medication was not associated with increased risk of cigarette use, and in fact stimulant treatments such as Ritalin seemed to lower this risk. People treated with stimulants such as methylphenidate during childhood were less likely to have substance use disorders in adulthood.

Among countries with the highest rates of use of methylphenidate medication is Iceland, where research shows that the drug was the most commonly used substance among people who inject drugs. The study involved 108 people who inject drugs and 88% of them had injected methylphenidate within the last 30 days and for 63% of them, methylphenidate was the most preferred substance.

Treatment of ADHD by way of methylphenidate has led to legal actions, including malpractice suits regarding informed consent, inadequate information on side effects, misdiagnosis, and coercive use of medications by school systems.

Research 
Methylphenidate may be effective as a treatment for apathy in Alzheimer's disease.

Replacement therapy
Methylphenidate has shown some benefits as a replacement therapy for individuals who are addicted to and dependent upon methamphetamine. Methylphenidate and amphetamine have been investigated as a chemical replacement for the treatment of cocaine addiction. Its effectiveness in treatment of cocaine, psychostimulant addiction or psychological dependence has not been proven.

Footnotes

References

External links 

 

 
2-Benzylpiperidines
Biology of bipolar disorder
Carboxylate esters
CYP2D6 inhibitors
Euphoriants
Novartis brands
Methyl esters
Nootropics
Norepinephrine–dopamine reuptake inhibitors
Sigma agonists
Stimulants
Attention deficit hyperactivity disorder management
Vasoconstrictors
Ergogenic aids
World Anti-Doping Agency prohibited substances
Wikipedia medicine articles ready to translate
2-Piperidinyl compounds